Unmunsan is a mountain of Gyeongsangbuk-do, eastern South Korea. It has an elevation of 1,195 metres. It is part of the Yeongnam Alps mountain range.

See also
List of mountains of Korea

References

External links
 Official website for the Yeongnam Alps

Mountains of South Korea
Mountains of North Gyeongsang Province